John Ritter (February 6, 1779 – November 24, 1851) was a Democratic member of the U.S. House of Representatives from Pennsylvania.

John Ritter was born in Exeter, Pennsylvania.  He received a limited schooling and apprenticed as a printer.  He was a member of the State constitutional convention in 1836.

Ritter was elected as a Democrat to the Twenty-eighth and Twenty-ninth Congresses.   He was not a candidate for renomination in 1846.  He served as editor and publisher of the Adler, a German newspaper, at Reading, Pennsylvania.  He died in Reading in 1851.  Interment in Reading's Charles Evans Cemetery.

Sources

The Political Graveyard

External links

 

1779 births
1851 deaths
People from Exeter, Pennsylvania
American people of German descent
Burials at Charles Evans Cemetery
Democratic Party members of the United States House of Representatives from Pennsylvania